is the first album by InoueYosuiOkudaTamio, the duo consisting of Japanese singer-songwriters Yōsui Inoue and Tamio Okuda. 
It was released in February 1997 under For Life and SME, two different labels that Inoue and Okuda had contracted with, respectively.

They formed songwriting team in the mid 1990s, the era that Okuda disbanded Unicorn and launched his solo career. 1995 saw the first release of their collaborative material, "Tsuki Hitoshizuku" co-written and sung by pop icon Kyōko Koizumi. In the following year, the pair wrote the song "Asia no Junshin" for Puffy, the new female pop duo produced by Okuda. It was released as Puffy's debut single in May 1996 and became a huge hit, peaking at number-three on the Japanese Oricon singles chart and selling over 1.18 million copies. Shopping features the remake versions of above‐mentioned songs by Inoue and Okuda, along with 10 of new songs that they wrote together.

Prior to the album, "Arigatou" was released as a single in February 1997. Both lead single and the album received moderate commercial success, entering top-ten on the Japanese Oricon Charts. 
In 2001, Inoue remade the song "Tebiki no You na Mono" on his album United Cover. Ten years after the album release, the pair recorded its successor Double Drive.

Track listing
All songs written and composed by Yōsui Inoue and Tamio Okuda, except lyrics for "Tsuki Hitoshizuku" co-written by Kyōko Koizumi
"" - 3:08
"2 Cars" - 4:32
"" - 4:24
"" - 2:40
"" - 5:48
"" - 3:37
"2500" - 6:39
"" - 4:57
"" - 4:13
"" - 4:57
"" - 3:36
"" - 3:53

Chart positions

Album

Single

Release history

References

1997 albums
Yōsui Inoue albums